Qizilcha is an urban-type settlement in northern-central Uzbekistan. It is located in Nurota District, Navoiy Region. The district town Nurota lies 40 km to the southwest. Its population is 3,400 (2016).

References

External links
Satellite map at Maplandia.com

Populated places in Navoiy Region
Urban-type settlements in Uzbekistan